Owasa is a city in Hardin County, Iowa, United States. The population was 34 at the time of the 2020 census.

History
Owasa was platted in 1883 or 1884. The name is derived from the Fox language, meaning "bear".

Geography
Owasa is located at  (42.432053, -93.205359).

Demographics

2010 census
As of the census of 2010, there were 43 people, 17 households, and 9 families living in the city. The racial makeup of the city was 90.7% White and 9.3% from two or more races.

There were 17 households, of which 41.2% had children under the age of 18 living with them, 35.3% were married couples living together, 5.9% had a female householder with no husband present, 11.8% had a male householder with no wife present, and 47.1% were non-families. 29.4% of all households were made up of individuals, and 5.9% had someone living alone who was 65 years of age or older. The average household size was 2.53 and the average family size was 3.44.

The median age in the city was 35.3 years. 32.6% of residents were under the age of 18; 7% were between the ages of 18 and 24; 27.9% were from 25 to 44; 25.6% were from 45 to 64; and 7% were 65 years of age or older. The gender makeup of the city was 44.2% male and 55.8% female.

2000 census
As of the census of 2000, there were 38 people, 17 households, and 8 families living in the city. The racial makeup of the city was 100.00% White.

There were 17 households, out of which 35.3% had children under the age of 18 living with them, 47.1% were married couples living together, and 47.1% were non-families. 35.3% of all households were made up of individuals, and 23.5% had someone living alone who was 65 years of age or older. The average household size was 2.24 and the average family size was 2.89.

In the city, the population was spread out, with 21.1% under the age of 18, 10.5% from 18 to 24, 31.6% from 25 to 44, 23.7% from 45 to 64, and 13.2% who were 65 years of age or older. The median age was 32 years. For every 100 females, there were 137.5 males. For every 100 females age 18 and over, there were 114.3 males.

The median income for a household in the city was $35,417, and the median income for a family was $75,938. Males had a median income of $26,250 versus $22,500 for females. The per capita income for the city was $17,047. There were no families and 6.5% of the population living below the poverty line, including no under eighteens and 40.0% of those over 64.

Education
Owasa lies within the Eldora–New Providence Community School District, which formed on July 1, 1980, with the merger of the Eldora and New Providence school districts. , it has a grade-sharing arrangement with Hubbard–Radcliffe Community School District and operates as "South Hardin Schools".

References

Cities in Iowa
Cities in Hardin County, Iowa
1880s establishments in Iowa